Qin Hui (born 1953) is a Chinese historian and public intellectual. He previously held the position of Professor of History, Institute of Humanities and Social Sciences, Tsinghua University, Beijing. He is now an Adjunct Professor in the Department of Government and Public Administration, the Chinese University of Hong Kong.

Career
Qin's primary field is economic history and peasant studies. His mentor was Zhao Lisheng, a Marxist historian in China. Since 1992 he has emerged as a prominent public intellectual, taking a stand on a range of issues, often in conflict with the official doctrines of the Chinese government. His general focus is China's agrarian history. Qin is a writer in the Sinosphere and the Chinese-speaking Internet, where collections of his works are commonly found. An important case in point is his doctrine of "issues versus isms" (wenti yu zhuyi).

Banning of Moving Away from the Imperial Regime
In December 2015, Qin Hui's new book Moving Away from the Imperial Regime, a collection of articles examining how the "dream" of constitutional democracy fell apart in China in the early 20th century after the country broke free from the Qing imperial order, was banned by the Chinese government. The book was a bestseller before the ban. "It's like they want to kill someone and won't even let him complain about it," Qin commented; "I can’t talk about this matter." An anonymous employee at the book's publisher said that the book had "quality problems". The ban was issued days before China celebrated its second annual Constitution Day.

Views

In terms of political ideology, Qin Hui defends a left-liberal position. He favors privatization under strict conditions of democratic openness. However he opposes market fundamentalism in its Chinese forms, and seeks to introduce institutions of social democracy, including some aspects of the welfare state. He strongly defends liberty as a political value, and often allies with other Chinese intellectuals labeled "liberal". He has engaged in polemics with the Chinese New Left, particularly its more populist and nationalist forms. He has for example signed petitions protesting chauvinistic responses to the September 11 attacks in New York City.

As a public intellectual, Qin has worked to initiate debates on social justice. Having himself been sent down to work as a peasant in a poor mountainous region of Southwest China in the Cultural Revolution, Qin has argued that China's peasantry suffers from a grave lack of social justice to the present day. At the same time, he has stated in his historical research that the peasantry has a strong tendency to enhance their citizen status whenever possible (whereas the urban working class has often tended to demand restitution of the dependent client status it enjoyed under the Maoist planned economy).

Qin has drawn on the work of Alexander Chayanov, Eric Wolf and other writers on agrarian society to attack cultural essentialism in studies of the Chinese peasantry, which often takes the form of portraying the peasantry as permanently imbued with Confucianism and the collectivist ethics of the feudal patriarchal lineage. Qin has been concerned to show that history rather than culture provides a solid explanatory framework for the empirical phenomena.

Contrary to the received Maoist view which emphasizes peasant wars as expressions of class struggle, in his research on agrarian history Qin concludes that the most significant fault-line in the countryside was not between peasant and landlord, but between peasant and official. This has obvious consequences for interpreting contemporary rural China.

Personal life

Qin Hui is married with one daughter. His wife, Jin Yan (金雁) is an eminent scholar of Eastern European and Russian affairs in her own right, often collaborating with Qin under the nom-de-plume Su Wen (苏文).

History lectures on the web
 Broken up and Reconnection (Chinese:秦晖-断裂与联系：30年、60年、120年的中国历程.mp3)
 Beware of problem colonization (Chinese:秦晖：警惕“问题殖民”.mp3)
 On Chinese peasants (Chinese:  秦晖-10.06.24-农民问题的历史与现实（天人讲堂）.mp3)
  China's Land system (Chinese:  秦晖-十字路口中的中国二元土地制度.mp3)

See also
 Chinese philosophy

References

Further reading
 
 
 
 Qin Hui and Su Wen, Tianyuanshi yu kuangxiangqu–Guanzhong moshi yu qianjindai shehuide zairenshi (Pastorals and rhapsodies: the Central Shaanxi model in rethinking pre-modern society) (Beijing: Zhongyang bianyi chubanshe, 1996).
 Qin Hui, Wenti yu zhuyi (Issues and isms) (Changchun chubanshe, 1999).

External links
 Dilemmas of Twenty-First Century Globalization: Explanations and Solutions, with a Critique of Thomas Piketty’s Twenty-First Century Capitalism by Qin Hui, Translation and Introduction by David Ownby

1953 births
People's Republic of China philosophers
Living people
People's Republic of China historians
Academic staff of Shaanxi Normal University
Academic staff of Tsinghua University
People from Guilin
Educators from Guangxi
Historians from Guangxi
Philosophers from Guangxi
21st-century Chinese philosophers
Liberalism in China